Craig Stanley (born 17 December 1971) is a former English cricketer.  Stanley was a right-handed batsman who bowled right-arm fast-medium.  He was born in North Shields, Northumberland.

Stanley made his debut for Northumberland in the 1991 Minor Counties Championship against Bedfordshire.  He played Minor counties cricket for Northumberland from 1991 to 2000, which included 50 Minor Counties Championship matches and 10 MCCA Knockout Trophy matches.  He made his List A debut against Nottinghamshire in the 1994 NatWest Trophy.  He made 2 further List A matches for the county, against the Northamptonshire Cricket Board and Bedfordshire, both in the 2000 NatWest Trophy.  In his 3 List A matches, he took 3 wickets at a bowling average of 45.00, with best figures of 2/66.

He also played Second XI cricket for the Essex, Durham and Somerset Second XIs.

Stanley studied at Durham University, where he competed for the university side.

References

External links
Craig Stanley at ESPNcricinfo
Craig Stanley at CricketArchive

1971 births
Living people
Sportspeople from North Shields
Cricketers from Tyne and Wear
English cricketers
Northumberland cricketers
Alumni of St Cuthbert's Society, Durham